This list of national public health agencies includes national level organizations responsible for public health, infectious disease control, and epidemiology. Many are represented in the International Association of National Public Health Institutes and discussed at national public health institutes.

National public health agencies

Africa 
 Ethiopian Public Health Institute (EPHI)
 Instituto Nacional de Saúde (INS)
 Institut National pour la Recherche Biomedicale (INRB)
 Kenya Medical Research Institute (KEMRI)
 National Institute for Communicable Diseases (NICD)
  National Institute for Medical Research (NIMR)
 Nigeria Centre for Disease Control (NCDC)
 Pasteur Institute of Algeria (Institut Pasteur d’Algérie, IPA)
 Pasteur Institute of Morocco (Institut Pasteur du Maroc, IPM)
 Zambia National Public Health Institute

Asia 
 Korea Disease Control and Prevention Agency (KDCPA)
 Centers for Disease Control (CDC)
 National Administration of Disease Prevention and Control, established on 13 May 2021
 Chinese Center for Disease Control and Prevention (CCDC)
 Centre for Health Protection (CHP)
 Institute of Epidemiology, Disease Control and Research (IEDCR)
 National Center for Disease Prevention and Control (NCDPC)
 National Centre for Disease Control (NCDC)
 Disease Control Division, Ministry of Health (DCD MOH)
 National Centre for Infectious Diseases (NCID)
 National Institute of Health  (NIH)
 National Institute of Health Research and Development (NIHRD)
 National Institute of Infectious Diseases (NIID)
 National Institute of Public Health (NIPH)
 National Institute of Health of Thailand (Thai NIH)
 National Institute of Hygiene and Epidemiology (NIHE)

Europe 
 Austrian National Public Health Institute (Gesundheit Österreich GmbH, GÖG)
 Centre for Disease Prevention and Control of Latvia (CDPC; Slimību profilakses un kontroles centrs, SPKC)
 Center for Public Health (of the Ministry of Health of Ukraine) (TsHZ, Центр громадського здоров’я Міністерства охорони здоров’я України)
 Danish Health Authority (SST)
 Responsibility of handling epidemiology and epidemic outbreak is shared with the Danish Patient Safety Authority and the Governmental Serum Institute.   
 Directorate of Health (Embætti landlæknis)
 Federal Office of Public Health (FOPH)
 Finnish Institute for Health and Welfare (THL)
 Health Protection Surveillance Centre (HPSC)
 Instituto de Salud Carlos III (ISCIII)
 Higher Institute of Health (Istituto Superiore di Sanità) (ISS)
 National Institute of Public Health – National Institute of Hygiene (NIPH–NIH)
 National Institute of Public Health, Prague (NIPH; Státní zdravotní ústav, SZÚ)
 National Public Health Organization (NPHO, former HCDCP)
 Nemzeti Népegészségügyi Központ (NNK)
 Netherlands National Institute for Public Health and the Environment (RIVM)
 Norwegian Institute of Public Health (FHI)
 Public Health Agency of Sweden
 Robert Koch Institute (RKI)
 Santé publique France i.e. French National Public Health Agency
 Sciensano
 Public Health Authority  (PHA; Úrad verejného zdravotníctva, ÚVZ)

Russia 
 Federal Service for Surveillance on Consumer Rights Protection and Human Wellbeing
 State Research Center of Virology and Biotechnology VECTOR

United Kingdom 
 UK Health Security Agency (UKHSA)
 Public Health England (PHE)
 Public Health Wales (PHW)
 Public Health Agency  (PHA)
 Public Health Scotland (PHS)

North America 
 Public Health Agency of Canada (PHAC)
 National Institute for Research on Nutrition and Health (INCIENSA)
 Pedro Kourí Tropical Medicine Institute (IPK)
 Secretaría de Salud (SALUD)

United States 
 Centers for Disease Control and Prevention (CDC)
 Epidemic Intelligence Service
 U.S.-Mexico Border Infectious Disease Surveillance Project
 National Center for Injury Prevention and Control
 State Level
 California Department of Public Health#Center for Infectious Disease (CID)
 Massachusetts Department of Public Health Bureau of Communicable Disease Control

South America 
 Administración Nacional de Laboratorios Carlos Malbrán (ANLIS, Malbrán)
 Agência Nacional de Vigilância Sanitária (ANVISA)
 Public Health Institute of Chile (ISP)
 National Institute of Health (of Colombia) (INS)
 Instituto Nacional de Salud (INS)

International NPHI related organizations and centers covering several countries
 Africa Centres for Disease Control and Prevention (African Union)
 Caribbean Public Health Agency (CARICOM)
 European Centre for Disease Prevention and Control (ECDC)
 Eurosurveillance
 European programme for intervention epidemiology training (EPIET)
 ESCAIDE
 Health Threat Unit
 World Health Organization (WHO)
 International Association of National Public Health Institutes (IANPHI)

References 

Government health agencies
Public health
Public health organizations